Shouldham is a village and civil parish in the English county of Norfolk.
It also contains a church (pictured) and a primary school (St Martins at Shouldham).

The villages name means 'homestead/village with an obligation'.

Shouldham is a parish of the Kings Lynn and West Norfolk district council, which is responsible for the most local services. Norfolk County Council is responsible for roads, some schools, and social services. For Westminster elections the parish forms part of the South West Norfolk constituency, represented by Liz Truss.

Notes

External links

Villages in Norfolk
Civil parishes in Norfolk
King's Lynn and West Norfolk